"Flawed Design" is a song by Canadian indie rock band Stabilo. It was released in January 2006 as the first single from their album Happiness and Disaster. The song has been performed live since at least May 2004, but was not released on an album until April 4, 2006. It received significant radio airplay across Canada.

Content
The flaws that the song mentions include lying, temptation, trust, deviousness, and treason.

Music video
The music video, directed by Stephen Scott, shows several scenarios where people have flaws that they lie about, such as cheating and bribery.

Awards
May 16, 2006: Received the SOCAN award for No. 1 Song for topping Canadian Music Network's Hot Adult Contemporary Chart.
September 2006: Digital Download Certified Gold (CRIA)
November 19, 2007: Received the SOCAN award for greatest number of plays on Canadian radio for 2006.

Chart positions

References

External links
Stabilo official website 
Stabilo fan page
OneMorePill Stabilo Fan Forums

2006 singles
Stabilo (band) songs
2006 songs
EMI Records singles
Songs written by Kevin Kadish